Anne Hobbs won in the final 6–4, 6–7, 6–4 against Ginny Purdy.

Seeds
A champion seed is indicated in bold text while text in italics indicates the round in which that seed was eliminated.

  Yvonne Vermaak (semifinals)
  Sabina Simmonds (second round)
  Kathleen Horvath (first round)
  Kate Latham (first round)
  Lucia Romanov (second round)
  Patricia Medrado (first round)
  Iva Budařová (semifinals)
  Candy Reynolds (quarterfinals)

Draw

External links
 1983 Virginia Slims of Indianapolis Draw

Virginia Slims of Indianapolis
1983 Virginia Slims World Championship Series